Jean-Pierre Eugène Hagnauer (24 February 1913 – 7 May 1986) was a French ice hockey player. He competed in the men's tournament at the 1936 Winter Olympics.

References

1913 births
1986 deaths
Ice hockey players at the 1936 Winter Olympics
Olympic ice hockey players of France